The San Juan Hotel was built in 1885 at a cost of $150,000 by C.E Pierce.  The hotel was located in Orlando, Florida on the corner of Orange Avenue and Central Avenue.  Harry Beeman of Beeman Chewing Gum purchased the hotel in 1889 and added two additional stories.  The second floor was a favorite spot to view hangings at the Orange County Jail. In the spring of 1922 the Turner Construction Company constructed an eight-story addition to the north of the 1885 5-story wing right next to the Beacham Theatre. The San Juan hotel addition included restaurants, a barber shop, a laundromat, a pharmacy, as well as an office for Braxton Beacham. The hotel first suffered hard times in the 1960s, and on September 7, 1975, the San Juan Hotel closed. But the 1976 It was opened again by a businessman but it didn't have enough clientele to stay open so it closed again in 1977. In October 1978 The San Juan reopened as the Grand Central Hotel, a hotel for gay clientele. But turns The San Juan was planning to be demolished holes were cut in the upper floors in preparation for demolition. But around 5:00 or 6:00 a.m. on the morning of January 2, 1979, the top 3 stories of the 1885 5-story wing (unoccupied at the time) were on fire, There was a water leak which flooded down into the shops on the 1st floor as well, The 1922 8-story wing suffered little damage. It is believed Arson started the fire. It is unknown to this day who started the fire. The San Juan Hotel was demolished in August 1980. The Orlando Historic Preservation Board were powerless to save it. In October 1980, the Orlando Historic Preservation board created the Downtown Orlando Historic District.

Tunnels connected the Beacham Theatre to the addition to the San Juan and Angebilt Hotels.

References

History of Orlando, Florida
Demolished hotels in Florida
Hotel buildings completed in 1885
Hotel buildings completed in 1922
Buildings and structures demolished in 1980
1980 disestablishments in Florida
1885 establishments in Florida